Cuvette is a department of the Republic of the Congo in the central part of the country. It borders the departments of Cuvette-Ouest, Likouala, Plateaux, and Sangha, and internationally, the Democratic Republic of the Congo and Gabon. The capital is Owando.  Cities and towns include Boundji, Makoua and Okoyo.

Administrative divisions 
Cuvette Department is divided into one commune and nine districts:

Districts 
 Makoua District
 Boundji District
 Mossaka District
 Loukoléla District
 Oyo District
 Ngoko District
 Ntokou District
 Tchikapika District
 Bokoma District

Communes 
 Commune of Owando

References

 
Departments of the Republic of the Congo